The Men's giant slalom competition of the Nagano 1998 Olympics was held at Shiga Kogen.

The defending world champion was Michael von Grünigen of Switzerland, who was also the defending World Cup giant slalom champion.

Results

References 

Men's giant slalom
Winter Olympics